Little Bearskin Creek is a  long 2nd order tributary to Bearskin Creek in Pittsylvania County, Virginia.  This is the only stream of this name in the United States.

Course 
Little Bearskin Creek rises about 0.25 miles southeast of Rondo, Virginia and then flows southeast to join Bearskin Creek about 2 miles southwest of Weal.

Watershed 
Little Bearskin Creek drains  of area, receives about 45.9 in/year of precipitation, has a wetness index of 384.44, and is about 54% forested.

See also 
 List of Virginia Rivers

References 

Rivers of Virginia
Rivers of Pittsylvania County, Virginia
Tributaries of the Roanoke River